Kheyrabad (also Romanized as Kheyrābād; also known as Kerkhep, Kharkhar, Kharkhep, Khar Khop, Kherkheb, and Kherkhep) is a village in Nahr-e Mian Rural District, Zalian District, Shazand County, Markazi Province, Iran. At the 2006 census, its population was 469, in 93 families.

References 

Populated places in Shazand County